Akbulatyurt (Aqbolt-Yurt) is a rural locality (a selo) in Khasavyurtovsky District, Republic of Dagestan, Russia. The population was 738 as of 2010. There are 9 streets.

Geography 
Akbulatyurt is located 32 km northwest of Khasavyurt (the district's administrative centre) by road. Terechnoye is the nearest rural locality.

References 

Rural localities in Khasavyurtovsky District